Archibald Thomas Robertson (November 6, 1863 – September 24, 1934) was a Southern Baptist preacher and biblical scholar whose work focused on the New Testament and Koine Greek.

Biography
Robertson was born at Cherbury near Chatham, Virginia. He was educated at Wake Forest (N. C.) College (M. A., 1885) and at the Southern Baptist Theological Seminary (SBTS), Louisville, Kentucky (Th. M., 1888), where he was thereafter instructor and professor  of New Testament interpretation, and remained in that post until one day in 1934, when he dismissed his class early and went home and died of a stroke.

Robertson's books are still consulted today, particularly his Word Pictures in the New Testament and his landmark volume A Grammar of the Greek New Testament in Light of Historical Research. In all, he published 45 books, several of which are still in print today. Robertson helped found the Baptist World Alliance in 1900. He was an important Southern Baptist and a well-respected scholar in his day. Robertson sought to equip his students with the proper tools for good preaching.

He was the son-in-law of the famous preacher, John Albert Broadus — Robertson's grave lies in the shadow of Broadus' — one of the SBTS co-founders. His wife was Ella Broadus Robertson (19 April 1872 — 5 December 1945) and she wrote such books as The Ministry of Women, Worship in the Home, The Art of Motherhood, and These Things Remain. She was also the editor of The Child's Bible. They are buried next to one another in Cave Hill Cemetery in Louisville. The epitaph on his tombstone "To me, to live is Christ and to die is gain" (Philippians 1:21).

Works
 Syllabus for New Testament Greek Syntax (1900)

 Bibliography of New Testament Greek (1903)
 Teaching of Jesus Concerning God the Father (1904)

 Short Grammar of the Greek New Testament (1908; Italian translation, 1910; German translation, 1911; French translation, 1911; Dutch translation, 1912)

 John the Loyal, or Studies in the Ministry of the Baptist (1911; new edition, 1915)
 The Glory of the Ministry (1911)
 A Grammar of the Greek New Testament in the Light of Historical Research (1914)
 Practical and Social Aspects of Christianity (1915)

 Studies in the New Testament (1915)
 The New Citizenship (1919)
 Luke the Historian in the Light of Historical Research (1920)

 Types of Preachers in the New Testament (1922)
 The Minister and His Greek New Testament (1923)
 An Introduction to the Textual Criticism of the New Testament (1925)
 Word Pictures of the New Testament (1927)
 Some Minor Characters in the New Testament (1928)
 Paul and the Intellectuals: The Epistle to the Colossians (1928)
 A Harmony of the Gospels For Students of the Life of Christ (1922) (Revised Version, 1885, significant reference to traditional readings) 
 Passing on the Torch and Other Sermons (1934)

References

External links

 
 
 

1863 births
1934 deaths
People from Pittsylvania County, Virginia
Baptists from Virginia
American Baptist theologians
Wake Forest University alumni
Southern Baptist Theological Seminary alumni
Burials at Cave Hill Cemetery
Grammarians of Ancient Greek
Scholars of Koine Greek
Southern Baptist Theological Seminary faculty
Southern Baptists
Baptist biblical scholars